Manuela Derr, married Rödel (born 17 July 1971 in Neubrandenburg) is a retired East German sprinter who specialized in the  400 metres. She was banned from competing for doping in 1992.

Biography

She won most of her medals at the junior level. At the 1988 World Junior Championships she finished fifth in the individual distance and a gold medal in 4x400 metres relay. At the 1989 European Junior Championships she won four medals; a gold medal in 4 × 400 m relay, a silver medal in the 200 metres and bronze medals in the 100 metres and 4x100 metres relay. At the 1990 World Junior Championships she won the bronze medal in the individual distance and finished fourth in relay.

At the 1990 European Championships Derr won a gold medal in relay, with teammates Annett Hesselbarth, Grit Breuer and Petra Schersing.

In 1992 Derr was found guilty of clenbuterol doping, together with training partners Grit Breuer and Katrin Krabbe.

Her personal best time was 51.95 seconds, achieved at the 1990 World Junior Championships in Plovdiv. She represented the sports club SC Neubrandenburg.

References

1971 births
Living people
East German female sprinters
Doping cases in athletics
German sportspeople in doping cases
European Athletics Championships medalists
People from Neubrandenburg
Sportspeople from Mecklenburg-Western Pomerania